Dandamis (presumably Greek rendering of "Dandi-Svami") was a philosopher, swami and a gymnosophist, whom Alexander encountered in the woods near Taxila, when he invaded India in 4th century B.C. He is also referred to as Mandanes.

Biography
When Alexander met some gymnosophists, who were of trouble to him. He learned that their leader was Dandamis, who lived in jungle, lying naked on leaves, near a water spring.

He then sent Onescratus to bring Dandamis to him. When Onescratus encountered Dandamis in forest, he gave him the message, that "Alexander, the Great son of Zeus, has ordered him to come to him. He will give you gold and other rewards but if you refuse, he may behead you." When Dandamis heard that, he did not even raise his head and replied lying in his bed of leaves. "God the Great King, is not a source of violence but provider of water, food, light and life. Your king cannot be a God, who loves violence and who is mortal. Even if you take away my head, you cannot take away my soul, which will depart to my God and leave this body like we throw away old garment. We, brahman do not love gold nor fear death. So your king has nothing to offer, which I may need. Go and tell your King: Dandamis, therefore, will not come to you. If he needs Dandamis, he must come to me."

When Alexander, learned of Dandamis' reply, he went to forest to meet Dandamis. Alexander sat before him in the forest for more than an hour. Dandamis asked why Alexander came to him, saying "I have nothing to offer you. Because we have no thought of pleasure or gold, we love God and despise death, whereas you love pleasure, gold and kill people, you fear death and despise God." Alexander stated, "I heard your name from Calanus and have come to learn wisdom from you." The conversation that followed between them is recorded by Greeks as Alexander-Dandamis colloquy..

See also
King Porus
Milinda Panha
Hinduism
Ambhi
Darius III
Spirituality

References

Philosophers and tutors of Alexander the Great
4th-century BC Indian philosophers
Rishis
Indo-Greek religions and philosophy
Indian Hindu spiritual teachers